Shirk (also Romanized as Shīrk; also known as Shīrag and Shīrg) is a village in Fakhrud Rural District, Qohestan District, Darmian County, South Khorasan Province, Iran. At the 2006 census, its population was 617, in 161 families.

References 

Populated places in Darmian County